The 12431 / 12432 Hazrat Nizamuddin–Thiruvananthapuram Rajdhani Express is a Rajdhani Express train service in India, connecting  in the country capital New Delhi to , the capital of Kerala state. It is the longest-running Rajdhani Express train in India, which covers about 2845 km in about 42 hours.

The train number is 12431/12432 which runs only on Tuesday, Thursday & Friday from Thiruvananthapuram Central to Hazrat Nizamuddin also it reverse runs in Sunday, Tuesday & Wednesday from Hazrat Nizamuddin to Thiruvananthapuram Central. The states connects as Kerala, Karnataka, Goa, Maharashtra, Gujarat, Rajasthan & New Delhi.

History
At the time of its introduction it had stops at Thiruvananthapuram Central, Ernakulam Junction, Thrissur, Shoranur Junction, Kozhikode, Kannur, Mangalore Junction, Madgoan Junction, Ratnagiri, Panvel, Vasai, Vadodara Junction and Kota Junction. Until 1999 it was the non-stop Rajdhani between Panvel and Hazrat Nizamuddin.

It has a record for the highest section speed, reaching  between Ratnagiri and Sawantwadi Road ( in 2 h 10 min).

Before the Konkan Railway came up in 1998, there were only 2 southbound Rajdhani from Delhi. Trivandrum Rajdhani Express was a weekly train back then having rake sharing agreement with Bangalore Rajdhani Express and it used to run via Chennai.

Coach composition

The Thiruvananthapuram Rajdhani generally has 2 AC 1st Class, 5 AC 2 tier, 11 AC 3 tier coaches, 1 pantry car, and 2 luggage cum generator coaches making a total of 21 LHB coach. Back in 1995, the train had 11 coaches only.

It shares its rakes with Chennai Rajdhani Express, Secunderabad Rajdhani Express and Madgaon Rajdhani Express. Earlier, it also shared its rake with the Bangalore Rajdhani Express.

Route
The service runs from Thiruvananthapuram Central via Kollam Junction, Alappuzha, Ernakulam Junction, Thrissur, Shoranur Junction, Kozhikode, Kannur, Kasaragod, Mangaluru Junction, Udupi, Karwar, Madgaon Junction, Ratnagiri, Panvel Junction, Vasai Road, Surat, Vadodara Junction, Kota Junction to Hazrat Nizamuddin.

Traction 
It is hauled by a Vadodara Loco Shed based WAP-7 (HOG equipped) electric locomotive from end to end.

Incidents
On 18 October 2018, two coaches of TVC Rajdhani derailed at a staffed level crossing at Thandla Road railway station near Ratlam when a truck rammed into the train. There were no injuries to train passengers but the truck driver was killed due to the collision. The train continued its journey after a delay of 7 hours towards New Delhi.

See also
 Rajdhani Express

References

External links 

Transport in Delhi
Rajdhani Express trains
Transport in Thiruvananthapuram
Rail transport in Kerala
Rail transport in Karnataka
Rail transport in Goa
Rail transport in Maharashtra
Rail transport in Gujarat
Rail transport in Rajasthan
Rail transport in Delhi
Railway services introduced in 1988